|}

This is a list of electoral district results for the Victorian 1964 election.

Results by electoral district

Albert Park

Ballarat North

Ballarat South

Balwyn

Benalla

Benambra

Bendigo

Box Hill

Brighton

Broadmeadows

Brunswick East

Brunswick West

Burwood

Camberwell

Caulfield

Coburg

Dandenong

Dundas

Elsternwick

Essendon

Evelyn

Fitzroy

Flemington

Footscray

Geelong

Geelong West

Gippsland East

Gippsland South

Gippsland West

Grant

Hampden

Hawthorn

Ivanhoe

Kara Kara

Kew

Lowan

Malvern

Melbourne

Mentone

Midlands

Mildura

Moonee Ponds

Moorabbin

Mornington

Morwell

Mulgrave

Murray Valley

Northcote

Oakleigh

Ormond

Polwarth

Portland

Prahran

Preston

Reservoir

Richmond 

 The two candidate preferred vote was not counted between the Labor and DLP candidates for Richmond

Ringwood

Ripponlea

Rodney

St Kilda

Sandringham

Scoresby

Swan Hill

Toorak

Williamstown

Yarraville 

 The two candidate preferred vote was not counted between the Labor and DLP candidates for Yarraville.

See also 

 1964 Victorian state election
 Members of the Victorian Legislative Assembly, 1964–1967

References 

Results of Victorian state elections
1960s in Victoria (Australia)